Heritage Lake is a census-designated place in Tazewell County, Illinois, United States. Its population was 1,520 as of the 2010 census.

Demographics

References

Census-designated places in Tazewell County, Illinois
Census-designated places in Illinois